Hare Ram is a 2008 Indian Telugu-language action thriller film directed by Harshavardhan, and produced by Kalyan Ram, under N.T.R. Arts. It stars Kalyan Ram in a dual role, along with Priyamani, Sindhu Tolani, Brahmanandam, Kota Srinivasa Rao, Ali and Raghu Babu. Mickey J Meyer composed the music, C. Ram Prasad handled the cinematography, and Gautam Raju edited the film. The action sequences were choreographed by Stunt Silva and Ram-Lakshman.

The narrative revolves around a conflict between Hari and Ram, conjoined twins separated at birth. When their parents part ways, Hari grows up to become an honest cop while Ram becomes a mentally unstable and violent man ready to kill anyone smarter than him, including his own brother. When Ram's killing spree begins, Hari takes charge and decides to arrest him within 24 hours or lose his job at the 25th hour.   

The film was released on 18 July 2008 and became a commercial success. In 2011, it was dubbed into Hindi-language as Julmo Ka Tandav. Later in an interview for his 2013 action thriller Om 3D, Kalyan Ram revealed Hare Ram to be the first Telugu-language film to make use of a flycam.

Plot
The film is about an IPS officer Hari (Kalyan Ram) who is busy investigating the murders of a news reporter (Prabhakar) and a well known doctor GK Reddy (Rajeev Kanakala) and then discovers that these are the murders done by his twin, Ram (also Kalyan Ram).

The story goes that Ram has a problem with his brain and is unable to control his hyper emotions about few things, which makes him a beast at times. He would not even hesitate to kill and does not like anyone being praised or belittling him. In this process, he builds a grudge against his own brother, who is good at everything and tries to kill him right during their childhood. Their mother (Seetha) is unable to tolerate all this and takes it upon herself to change Ram, so she takes him away from Hari to avoid further hatred, but then not much change happens in the nature of Ram even after they grow up. Meanwhile, Hari is often chased by Anjali (Priyamani) who poses as a bank employee, but in truth, she is actually a CBI officer who comes to arrest Hari since she suspects his hand in the killings. Apparently, the doctor happens to be the younger brother of the health minister Siva Reddy (Kota Srinivasa Rao) and from then on, the minister is closely on the heels of the killer. Anjali finally manages to arrest Hari successfully through a plan of hers, and soon she realizes her folly when she chances upon his mother and understands the entire story of Hari and Ram.

Ram is initially thought to have committed the murders. Here comes a twist! Sravani (Sindhu Tolani), a journalist (Ram's love interest), was jointly killed by the channel owner and the health minister when she exposes their plans of running a health mafia. Ram attacked the doctor to seek revenge. The doctor injected Ram with the deadly virus, and Ram, deciding to sacrifice himself to save the people around him, fell under Hari's car. He then asked Hari to shoot him to save the others. Hari shot him with no other alternative left. He then decided to kill the culprits by impersonating Ram. Hari is released from jail by the court for the purpose of catching. He then kidnaps the Health Minister in a van and takes him to a lonely place. When the policemen and the others gather there, Hari escapes from the van by means of the sewage pipe and gets into the public. He then triggers a bomb in the van. Ram's mother thinks that Ram sacrificed his life for the country and feels proud of him. The films ends with Hari explaining to the taxi driver (Brahmanandam), how he escaped from CBI custody.

Cast

Nandamuri Kalyan Ram as ACP Hari Krishna / Ram (Dual role)
 Priyamani as Anjali
 Sindhu Tolani as Sravani
 Kota Srinivasa Rao as Health Minister  G. Siva Reddy
 Rajeev Kanakala as Dr. GK Reddy
 Chandra Mohan as Hari and Ram's father
 Seetha as Hari and Ram's mother
 Sudha as Hari's aunt
 Chalapathi Rao as Hari's uncle
 Kolla Ashok Kumar as Rajeev's brother
 Ali as Manager of OCOC Bank
 Brahmanandam as Nijam, Taxi Driver
 Raghu Babu as Police Officer
 Venu Madhav as a Car thief
 Lakshmipathi as Siva Reddy's assistant
 Raghu Karumanchi as Raghu
 Ranganath as Dr. Naidu
 Fish Venkat as Bald Head
 Subbaraju as Rishi
 Brahmaji as Rishi's brother
 Shankar Melkote as Melkote
 Prabhakar Podakandla as Rajeev
 Apoorva as Bhagyam
 Vizag Prasad as DGP Ravindranath
 Ambati Srinivas as a waiter

Soundtrack
The music was composed by Mickey J. Meyer and released by Mayuri Audio.

Home media
Hare Ram is currently streaming on Aha.

References

External links
 
review
review

2008 films
2000s Telugu-language films
2008 action thriller films
Indian action thriller films
Indian police films
Films scored by Mickey J Meyer
Films about twin brothers
Indian films about revenge
Twins in Indian films
2000s police films